The Thwake Dam or Thwake Multi-purpose Water Development Program  is a dam complex being built on the Athi River in Kenya. The dam is meant to be a multipurpose dam that provides drinking water, agricultural irrigation water, hydropower, and other water supply infrastructure. Water storage is 681 million cubic metres, and is meant for rural homes, Konza and other local jurisdictions. The dam cost KSh. 82 billion and is being built by the China Gezhouba Group Company. The Funding was provided by the African Development Fund.

Water pollution concerns 
The need for potable water from the dam led to a number of conservation projects upstream, trying to create better clean water, such as in Ondiri Wetland. Moreover, many industries had been discharging directly into the river. In July 2021, the dam was criticized by auditor Nancy Gathungu for the lack of clean and safe water to be retained due to pollution locations like Athi River.

References 

Dams in Kenya